Philippe Etienne may refer to:

 Philippe Étienne (born 1949), Haitian sprinter
 Philippe Étienne (born 1955), French diplomat